The Chukotko-Kamchatkan or Chukchi–Kamchatkan languages are a language family of extreme northeastern Siberia. Its speakers traditionally were indigenous hunter-gatherers and reindeer-herders. Chukotko-Kamchatkan is endangered. The Kamchatkan branch is moribund, represented only by Western Itelmen, with only 4 or 5 elderly speakers left. The Chukotkan branch had close to 7,000 speakers left (as of 2010, the majority being speakers of Chukchi), with a reported total ethnic population of 25,000.

While the family is sometimes grouped typologically and geographically as Paleosiberian, no external genetic relationship has been widely accepted as proven. The most popular such proposals have been for links with Eskimo–Aleut, either alone or in the context of a wider grouping.

Alternative names
Less commonly encountered names for the family are Chukchian, Chukotian, Chukotan, Kamchukchee and Kamchukotic. Of these, Chukchian and Chukotian are ambiguous, since both terms are sometimes used to refer specifically to the family's northern branch.

In addition, Luorawetlan (also spelled Luoravetlan) has been in wide use since 1775 as a name for the family, although it is properly the self-designation of one of its constituent languages, Chukchi. The derivative Luorawetlanic may be preferable as a name for the family.

Languages
The Chukotko-Kamchatkan family consists of two distantly related dialect clusters, Chukotkan and Kamchatkan. Chukotkan is considered anywhere from three to five languages, whereas there is only one surviving Kamchatkan language, Itelmen.

The relationship of the Chukotkan languages to Itelmen is at best distant, and has been met with only partial acceptance by scholars.

All the Chukotko-Kamchatkan languages are under pressure from Russian. Almost all speakers are bilingual in Russian, and few members of the ethnic groups associated with the languages born after 1970 speak any language but Russian.

The accepted classification is this:

 Kamchatkan
 Southern Kamchadal †
 Eastern Kamchadal †
 Itelmen (Western Kamchadal)
 Chukotkan
 Chukchi
 Koryak
 Alyutor
 Kerek †

Relation to other language families
The Chukotko-Kamchatkan languages have no generally accepted relation to any other language family. There are several theories about possible relationships to existing or hypothetical language families.

Paleosiberian
The Chukotko-Kamchatkan languages are sometimes classified among the Paleosiberian languages, a catch-all term for language groups with no identified relationship to one another that are believed to represent remnants of the language map of Siberia prior to the advances of Turkic and Tungusic.

Michael Fortescue (2011) suggests that Chukotko-Kamchatkan and Nivkh (Gilyak, Amuric) are related to each other on the basis of morphological, typological, and lexical evidence. Together, Chukokto-Kamchatkan and Nivkh could form a larger Chukokto-Kamchatkan-Amuric language family.

Eurasiatic
Joseph Greenberg identifies Chukotko-Kamchatkan (which he names Chukotian) as a member of Eurasiatic, a proposed macrofamily that includes Indo-European, Altaic, and Eskimo–Aleut, among others. Greenberg also assigns Nivkh and Yukaghir, sometimes classed as "Paleosiberian" languages, to the Eurasiatic family.

While the Eurasiatic hypothesis has been well received by Nostraticists and some Indo-Europeanists, it remains very controversial. Part of the reason is that the Eurasiatic hypothesis rests on mass comparison of lexemes, grammatical formatives, and vowel systems (see Greenberg 2000–2002), rather than on the prevailing view that regular sound correspondences that are linked to a wide array of lexemes and grammatical formatives are the only valid means to establish genetic relationship (see for instance Baldi 2002:2–19).

Murray Gell-Mann, Ilia Peiros, and Georgiy Starostin group Chukotko-Kamchatkan languages and Nivkh with Almosan instead of Eurasiatic.

Uralo-Siberian
Michael Fortescue, a specialist in Eskimo–Aleut as well as in Chukotko-Kamchatkan, argued for a link between Uralic, Yukaghir, Chukotko-Kamchatkan, and Eskimo–Aleut calling this proposed grouping Uralo-Siberian. Later, he has argued for Nivkh as the closest relative of Chukotko-Kamchatkan and suggests interpreting the similarities to Uralo-Siberian through language contact.

Chukotko-Kamchatkan–Amuric

Michael Fortescue argued that Nivkh and Chukotko-Kamchatkan are related, and that their common ancestor might have been spoken 4000 years ago.

See also 

 Proto-Chukotko-Kamchatkan
 Kamchadal

References

 Baldi, Philip. 2002. The Foundations of Latin. Berlin: Mouton de Gruyter.
 Fortescue, Michael. 1998. Language Relations Across Bering Strait. London: Cassell & Co.
 Fortescue, Michael. 2005. Comparative Chukotko–Kamchatkan Dictionary. Trends in Linguistics 23. Berlin: Mouton de Gruyter.
 
 Greenberg, Joseph H. 2000. Indo-European and Its Closest Relatives: The Eurasiatic Language Family. Volume 1, Grammar. Stanford: Stanford University Press.
 Greenberg, Joseph H. 2002. Indo-European and Its Closest Relatives: The Eurasiatic Language Family. Volume 2, Lexicon. Stanford: Stanford University Press.

 
Agglutinative languages
Languages of Russia
Language families
History of Northeast Asia
Paleosiberian languages